Perthshire was a Scottish county constituency of the House of Commons of the Parliament of Great Britain from 1708 to 1801 and of the Parliament of the United Kingdom from 1801 until 1885, representing a seat for one Member of Parliament (MP).

Creation
The British parliamentary constituency was created in 1708 following the Acts of Union, 1707 and replaced the former Parliament of Scotland shire constituency of Perthshire.

Boundaries

The constituency was created to cover the county of Perth, minus the burgh of Perth, which was a component of the Perth Burghs constituency. The Scottish Reform Act 1832 transferred from Perthshire to Clackmannanshire and Kinross-shire the parishes of Tulliallan, Culross and Muckhart and the Perthshire portions of the parishes of Logie and Fossaway.

History
The constituency elected one Member of Parliament (MP) by the first past the post system until the seat was abolished in 1885.

As a result of the Redistribution of Seats Act 1885, the Perthshire constituency was divided to create Eastern Perthshire and Western Perthshire in 1885.

Members of Parliament

Election results

Elections in the 1830s

Campbell succeeded to the peerage, becoming 2nd Marquess of Breadalbane and causing a by-election.

Elections in the 1840s
Murray succeeded to the peerage, becoming 4th Earl of Mansfield and causing a by-election.

Elections in the 1850s

Elections in the 1860s

Elections in the 1870s

Stirling-Maxwell's death caused a by-election.

Elections in the 1880s

Notes and references 

Historic parliamentary constituencies in Scotland (Westminster)
Constituencies of the Parliament of the United Kingdom established in 1708
Constituencies of the Parliament of the United Kingdom disestablished in 1885
History of Perth and Kinross
Politics of Perth and Kinross